Saltora Assembly constituency is an assembly constituency in Bankura district in the Indian state of West Bengal. It is reserved for scheduled castes.

Overview
As per orders of the Delimitation Commission, No. 247 Saltora Assembly constituency (SC) is composed of the following: Saltora and Mejia community development blocks; Banasuria, Barashal, Lachhmanpur and Latiaboni gram panchayats of Gangajalghati community development block.

Saltora  Assembly constituency  (SC) is part of No. 36 Bankura (Lok Sabha constituency).

Members of Legislative Assembly

Election results

2021
In the 2021 elections, Chandana Bauri of BJP defeated her nearest rival, Sontosh Kumar Mondal of Trinamool Congress.

2016
In the 2016 elections, Swapan Bauri of Trinamool Congress defeated his nearest rival, Sasthi Charan Bauri of CPI(M).

2011
In the 2011 elections, Swapan Bauri of Trinamool Congress defeated his nearest rival, Sasthi Charan Bauri of CPI(M).

.# Swing calculated on Congress+Trinamool Congress vote percentages taken together in 2006, for the now defunct Gangajalghati constituency.

References

Assembly constituencies of West Bengal
Politics of Bankura district